This list is of the Natural Monuments of Japan within the Prefecture of Kagawa.

National Natural Monuments
As of 1 April 2021, twelve Natural Monuments have been designated, including one *Special Natural Monument.

Prefectural Natural Monuments
As of 30 September 2020, twenty-nine Natural Monuments have been designated at a prefectural level.

Municipal Natural Monuments
As of 1 May 2020, sixty-six Natural Monuments have been designated at a municipal level.

See also
 Cultural Properties of Japan
 Parks and gardens in Kagawa Prefecture
 List of Places of Scenic Beauty of Japan (Kagawa)
 List of Historic Sites of Japan (Kagawa)

References

External links
  Cultural Properties in Kagawa Prefecture

 Kagawa
Kagawa Prefecture